Wendell Phillips Dabney (4 November 1865, in Richmond, Virginia – 3 June 1952, in Cincinnati) was an influential civil rights organizer, author, and musician as well as a newspaper editor and publisher in Cincinnati, Ohio.

Career 
Dabney was born in Richmond, Virginia,  months after the end of the American Civil War to former slaves John Marchall Dabney (1824–1900) and Elizabeth Foster (maiden; 1834–1907).

Formal education 
Wendell Dabney was a talented musician and graduated from Richmond High School in the first integrated graduation ceremony at Richmond High School. In 1883, Dabney, was enrolled in the preparatory department at Oberlin College. While there, he was first violinist at the Oberlin Opera House and was a member of the Cademian Literary Society.

Post college career 
He worked as a waiter and teacher before moving to Boston where he opened a music studio. He taught in Richmond schools from 1886 until 1892.

Dabney traveled to Cincinnati in 1894 and met Nellie Foster Jackson, a widow who had two sons, in Indiana. They married in 1897 and settled in Cincinnati where he opened a music studio, became involved in politics, was city paymaster, became the first president of the local chapter of the NAACP, and started the Ohio Enterprise newspaper in 1902. It eventually became The Union which he published until 1952, the year of his death.

He wrote several books and pamphlets including one about leading African Americans in Cincinnati, a biography of his close friend Maggie L. Walker (the first woman to charter a bank in the U.S.), and published a collection of his newspaper writings. Walker hired Dabney to write her biography. He also composed songs.

He objected to laws restricting marriage between African Americans and whites.

The Dabney Building was at 420 McAllister Street.

Family 
Wendell Dabney was an uncle and music teacher of ragtime pianist, songwriter, and composer Ford Dabney (1883–1958).

Wendell Dabney's father, John Marshall Dabney, was, in November 2015, posthumously honored in Richmond, Virginia, at the Quirk Hotel as a famed caterer and bartender – known, among other things, as the world's greatest mint julep-maker. The event was attended by notable community members and one of his great-great granddaughters, Jennifer Hardy (née Jennifer Dehaven Jackson). Jennifer's mother (great-granddaughter-in-law of John Marshall Dabney), Mary Hinkson (1925–2014), was an internationally celebrated modern dancer.

One of Wendell Dabney's brothers, John Milton Dabney (1867–1967), had been a player in the Negro leagues, including the Cuban Giants. Buck Spottswood, as manager, and J. Milton Dabney as team captain, reorganized, in 1895, the Manhattan Baseball Club of Richmond, Virginia.

Another family member is filmmaker Richard Jackson.

Selected extant works

Music 
 "De Noble Game of Craps" (©1898), words by W.P. Dabney, music by Gussie L. Davis Howley, Haviland and Company, New York; 
 "Fall Festival March (©1900), by W.P. Dabney, arranged by James M. Fulton, Rudolph Wurlitzer Company; 
 "God, Our Father," a prayer" (©1904), words and music by W.P. Dabney, Dabney Publishing Company, Cincinnati; 
 "If You Must Be Caught" (©1921), words and music by W.P. Dabney, arranged by Artie Matthews, Dabney Publishing Company, Cincinnati
 "You Will Miss the Colored Soldier", aka "My Old Sweetheart" (©1921), words and music by W.P. Dabney, Dabney Publishing Company, Cincinnati;

Books 
 Standard Mandolin Method (©1895), compiled by James F. Roach and W.P. Dabney, Rudolph Wurlitzer Company; 
Dabney's Complete Method of Guitar
The Wolf and the Lamb (1913), a pamphlet published in response to proposed legislation in Ohio to ban miscegenation; 
 Maggie L. Walker and the I.O of Saint Luke: The Woman and Her Work (re: Maggie L. Walker and the Independent Order of Saint Luke), Dabney Publishing Company (1920, 1927); 
 Cincinnati's Colored Citizens: Historical, Sociological and Biographical, Dabney Publishing Company (1926); 
Chisum's Pilgrimage, and Others republished from his newspaper, The Union, a collection of articles he wrote;

References

Copyrights 

 Catalog of Copyright Entries, Part 3 – Musical Compositions, New Series (ending 1945) & Third Series (beginning 1946), Library of Congress, Copyright Office
 Original copyrights

References 

1865 births
1952 deaths
African-American schoolteachers
Schoolteachers from Virginia
Editors of Ohio newspapers
20th-century American newspaper founders
20th-century American newspaper editors
African-American guitarists
20th-century American male writers
20th-century American composers
American male journalists
Oberlin College alumni
African-American journalists
Writers from Cincinnati
Writers from Richmond, Virginia
Journalists from Virginia
African-American composers
African-American company founders
American company founders
African-American activists
Journalists from Ohio
Activists for African-American civil rights
Activists from Ohio
Activists from Virginia
Composers of Christian music
African-American Christians